After there already existed a 2005-06 ranking for the Men's. This was the first season ateam handball ranking for the clubs and the men's college was created.

Legend

Men's Top 25

Women's Top 5

Collegiate Top 5
The record at the college ranking is only against other college teams.

References

Handball in the United States
College sports rankings in the United States